Torreya State Park is a 13,735 acre (56 km²) Florida State Park, United States National Natural Landmark and historic site thirteen miles (19 km) north of Bristol. It is located north of S.R 12 on the Apalachicola River, in northwestern Florida (Florida Panhandle), at 2576 N.W. Torreya Park Road.

It was named for the Florida Nutmeg (Torreya taxifolia) trees, a rare species of Torreya tree endemic to the local east bank of the Apalachicola River's limestone bluffs.

Geography
With river swamps and high pinelands, extensive ravines and high bluffs along the river, the park has one of the most variable terrains of any in Florida. The high elevation of the park is about 300 feet at the top of Logan Hill. Many streams run through the park.

History
Torreya State Park is one of the original Florida state parks developed by the Civilian Conservation Corps during the Great Depression. The park was named for the Florida tree Torreya taxifolia. Due to the river's importance during the Civil War, a six-cannon battery was placed on a bluff to prevent the passage of Union gunboats. These cannons never saw combat action at this location.  The gun pits' remains can still be seen in the park. 

Prior Native American inhabitation has been confirmed by archaeological discoveries in the area. 

In 1818, General Andrew Jackson and his army crossed the Apalachicola here during the First Seminole War. Ten years later, the first government road to cross the new Territory met the river here.

Gregory House
In 1849, Jason Gregory built a plantation house at Ocheesee Landing, across from the park's current location. After the Civil War, like most plantations, it fell into disuse.

Not long after the Civilian Conservation Corps was established in 1933, they started work to create the park. Part of the project in 1935 was disassembling the old Gregory House, moving it across the river and reconstructing it in the park, where it stands today. Visitors can tour the Gregory House for a small fee.

Natural history

Flora
The park is one of the few places in the country where the endangered species Few-flowered croomia (Croomia pauciflora) can still be found. Other endangered species in the park include the feathery false lily of the valley (Maianthemum racemosum), Canadian honewort (Cryptotaenia canadensis), and bloodroot (Sanguinaria canadensis).

The varieties of hardwood trees include Southern live oak (Quercus virginiana), White oak (Quercus alba), Water hickory (Carya aquatica), Southern wax myrtle (Myrica cerifera), Sourwood (Oxydendrum arboreum),  American beech (Fagus grandifolia), Tulip tree (Liriodendron tulipifera), Florida maple (Acer floridanum), and Sweetgum (Liquidambar styraciflua). 
Species of softwood trees include the variety of both Needle palm (Rhapidophyllum hystrix) and Dwarf palmetto (Sabal minor), Loblolly pine (Pinus taeda), Longleaf pine (Pinus palustris), and Redbay (Persea borbonia).

The endemic Florida Nutmeg (Torreya taxifolia) trees are restricted to the limestone bluffs and their ravines within Torreya State Park, along the east bank of the Apalachicola River in northern Florida and southern Georgia.  It was one of the first federally listed  in 1984. It is a Critically endangered species on the IUCN Red List, due to estimated 98% decline in mature individuals within the last three generations. Its total extent of occurrence is estimated to be about only . The Apalachicola valley served as a refugium for T. taxifola during the last ice age, when its range shrank due to cooler temperatures.

Fauna
Many animals can be seen in the park. Some of the mammals there include deer, squirrel, raccoon, opossum, fox, skunk, rabbit, bobcat and black bear. Dozens of species of birds can be viewed. Numerous species of amphibians and reptiles exist there as well, such as the Eastern Hognose Snake, gopher tortoises, and the rare Apalachicola dusky salamander.

Recreational activities
The park has such amenities as birding, boating, hiking, picnicking, wildlife viewing and full camping facilities. It also has concessions, a museum and interpretive exhibit.

The Apalachicola River Bluffs Trail, a National Recreational Trail, is part of the park.

Gallery

References

External links

 
 Torreya State Park at Florida State Parks
 Torreya State Park at State Parks
 Torreya State Park Trails at Florida Department of Environmental Protection
  A Special Place at  A Glimpse of Florida
Explore Southern History: Torreya State Park – includes information on Gregory House

State parks of Florida
Parks in Liberty County, Florida
Museums in Liberty County, Florida
Historic house museums in Florida
Plantation houses in Florida
Farm museums in Florida
American Civil War museums in Florida
Military and war museums in Florida
Houses in Liberty County, Florida
National Register of Historic Places in Liberty County, Florida
National Natural Landmarks in Florida
Protected areas established in 1935
Civilian Conservation Corps in Florida
1976 establishments in Florida
1935 establishments in Florida
National Park Service rustic in Florida